Gilberto José Rodríguez Orejuela (30 January 1939 – 31 May 2022) was a Colombian drug lord and one of the leaders of the Cali Cartel.

Cali Cartel

Gilberto Rodríguez Orejuela, along with his brother Miguel Rodríguez Orejuela and José Santacruz Londoño, formed the Cali Cartel in 1975. They were initially primarily involved in marijuana trafficking. In the 1980s, they branched out into cocaine trafficking. For a time, the Cali Cartel supplied 80 percent of the United States through Rodriguez's son, Jorge Alberto Rodriguez, and 90 percent of the European cocaine market. On 15 November 1984, Gilberto was captured in Spain. At the time of his arrest, he was accompanied by Jorge Luis Ochoa Vásquez. Gilberto would be in Spain to hold meetings with the aim of expanding the cartel business on the European continent. From that moment on, the cartel began to work with traffickers in Galicia, but mainly established strategic alliances with the powerful Camorra, which would be in charge of the distribution of Cali cocaine throughout Europe.

The Cali Cartel was less violent than its rival, the Medellín Cartel. While the Medellín Cartel was involved in a brutal campaign of violence against the Colombian government, the Cali Cartel grew. After the demise of Pablo Escobar, the Colombian authorities turned their attention to the Cali Cartel. The police campaign against the cartel began in the summer of 1995. President Ernesto Samper dispatched a "joint task force" code named "Search Bloc", formed by top police and elite commandos headed by Police General Rosso José Serrano, declaring an all-out war against the drug cartels.

Capture

On 9 June 1995, Rodríguez Orejuela was arrested by the Colombian National Police (PNC) during a house raid in Cali. When the police had searched the home several days earlier, he had escaped detection by hiding in a hollowed-out bathroom cabinet with an oxygen tank.

He was sentenced to 15 years in prison but was temporarily freed in early November 2002, due to a controversial judicial order issued by deputy judge Pedro José Suárez.  In March 2003, Rodríguez Orejuela was recaptured by Colombian authorities in Cali.

Extradition to the United States

Gilberto Rodríguez Orejuela was extradited to the United States on 3 December 2004.  His brother Miguel was also arrested. 
 
On 26 September 2006, both Gilberto and Miguel were sentenced to 30 years in prison, after pleading guilty to charges of conspiring to import  cocaine to the U.S. They took this deal in exchange for the United States agreeing not to bring charges against their family members. Their lawyers, David Oscar Markus and Roy Kahn, were able to obtain immunity for 29 family members.
 
On 16 November 2006, the brothers pleaded guilty to one count of conspiring to engage in money laundering. Both were sentenced to an additional 87 months in prison. The two prison terms were set to run concurrently.
 
At the time of his death, Gilberto Rodríguez Orejuela was serving a 30-year sentence at the Federal Correctional Institution, Butner, a medium-security facility in North Carolina. He was inmate number 14023-059 with a release date of 15 July 2029, at an age of 90 years old.

On 5 March 2018, a Colombian court sentenced eight relatives of the Rodríguez brothers to nine years in prison for laundering money that had been obtained during the Rodriguez brothers' time as heads of the Cali Cartel.
  Specifically, the court found that the family had used their legitimate businesses (including the pharmacy chain Drogas La Rebaja) to launder billions of pesos.  These individuals had also shifted the money through various bank accounts in order to make it appear legitimate.

On 6 February 2020, Rodríguez Orejuela submitted an application to a Miami federal judge seeking compassionate early release pursuant to the First Step Act. The application was made despite having served only half of his 30 year term. On 28 April 2020, Federal District Judge Federico Moreno rejected the application stating that there were no "extraordinary and compelling" grounds to support the application. The judge stated that "the court is totally unwilling to undermine and undo such public respect for the law, as well as the gravity of the offenses committed" and that while Rodríguez Orejuela has endured a litany of chronic illnesses including cancer, his criminal record is so repugnant that there is no way he could effectively cut his sentence in half.

He died at a prison medical center in Butner, North Carolina on 31 May 2022 at the age of 83.

In popular culture
In 2010 Caracol TV Series El Cartel Rodríguez Orejuela is portrayed by the actor Hermes Camelo in the guise of the character of Leonardo Villegas. A younger version of the character are portrayed by Gustavo Angarita Jr. and Juan Pablo Urrego in prequel series The Snitch Cartel: Origins. 
In the 2012 Caracol TV series Escobar, el patrón del mal, Rodríguez Orejuela is portrayed by the actor Harold Devasten as the character of Gildardo Gonzalez
In the 2013 RCN TV series Tres Caínes, Rodríguez Orejuela is portrayed by Luis Enrique Roldán as the character of Alberto Ramírez Rajuela.
In the 2014 RCN TV series En la boca del lobo is portrayed by Sain Castro as the character of Edilberto Ramírez Orjuela.
In the 2015 Netflix Original Series Narcos, Rodríguez Orejuela is portrayed by Damián Alcázar.
 In the novel El ajedrecista, of writer Esteban Navarro se describe a Gilberto como alguien muy influyente, que le gustaba relacionarse con estrellas del espectáculo mexicano como Roberto Gómez Bolaños Chespirito, o El Chavo del 8.

See also
List of crime bosses convicted in the 21st century
Notable drug lords

References

External links
 Plea agreement

1939 births
2022 deaths
Cali Cartel traffickers
Colombian crime bosses
Colombian drug traffickers
People from Tolima Department
Colombian people imprisoned abroad
Prisoners and detainees of the United States federal government
People extradited from Colombia to the United States